Castlereagh Parish,  is a civil parish of Cumberland County, located west of Sydney in New South Wales, Australia.

The parish is on the Nepean River between Penrith, New South Wales and Richmond, New South Wales in the foothills of the Great Dividing Range.

References

Parishes of Cumberland County